Grenay is a commune in the Pas-de-Calais department in the Hauts-de-France region of France. It is part of the arrondissement of Lens, the canton of Wingles and the Communaupole de Lens-Liévin. Its population was 6,799 in 2019. The current mayor is Christian Champire, elected in 2020.

Geography

Coal mining

Excavation of the  Mine 11 at Grenay by the Compagnie des mines de Béthune began in October 1904.
Excavation of the  Shaft 11bis, for ventilation, began in May 1906.
Extraction started in April 1908.
The shafts were back-filled in 1967 and the surface installions destroyed in 1969.

Population

Places of interest
 The church of Notre-Dame, dating from the eighteenth century.
 The church of St.Louise, dating from the twentieth century.
 The war memorial and the CWGC graves.
 An extremely old tree.

Twin town
 Ballyshannon, Co. Donegal, Ireland
 Ruddington, Nottinghamshire, United Kingdom

National Gerald Day 21 September

References

External links

 Official town website 
 CWGC  cemetery
 Website of the Communaupole de Lens-Liévin 
 Grenay on the Quid website 

Communes of Pas-de-Calais
Artois